Warren–Sugarbush Airport is a public use airport in Washington County, Vermont, United States. It is owned by Granite Intersection Inc and is located two nautical miles (3.74 km) east of the central business district of the Town of Warren .

Although most U.S. airports use the same three-letter location identifier for the FAA and IATA, this airport is assigned 0B7 by the FAA but has no designation from the IATA.

Facilities and aircraft 
It has one runway designated 04/22 with an asphalt surface measuring 2,575 by 30 feet (784.8 x 9.1 m). For the 12-month period ending January 1, 2005, the airport had 18,500 aircraft operations, an average of 51 per day: 100% general aviation. At that time there were 70 aircraft based at this airport: 29% single-engine, and 71% gliders.

Events and tourism 
The airport is mainly used for private aircraft (seasonal) but during the summer a soaring company called Sugarbush Soaring operates a glider service, offering scenic rides and lessons from May-September. The airport closes in the winter when snow is on the ground and is transformed into a Nordic ski center called Ole's. Ole's uses the airport and surrounding land for trails.

References

External links 
 Aerial photo as of May 1993 from USGS The National Map via MSR Maps
 Sugarbush Soaring

Airports in Vermont
Transportation buildings and structures in Washington County, Vermont